Ramon Miller (born 17 February 1987, Nassau) is a Bahamian sprinter.

He was inducted into the Dickinson State University Hall of Fame class of 2020.

Career

He was part of the Bahamas' silver medal-winning team in the men's 4 × 400 m relay at the 2008 Beijing Olympics, after running in the heats.

Miller is a former athlete at Dickinson State University where he won nine NAIA track and field national championships in his four-year career. Miller was named the most outstanding performer of his final NAIA national meet after winning the open 400-meter dash and helping the 4 x 200 and 4 x 400 relay teams win titles.

Miller won a bronze medal at the XIX Commonwealth Games, in Delhi, India.  A year later he won a bronze medal at the 2011 Pan American Games in Guadalajara, Mexico. He also won gold at the 2012 London Olympics with the Bahamas 4 × 400 m team beating medal favorites USA with a national record. Miller ran the anchor leg in the finals to bring a gold medal to the Bahamas.

Achievements

References

External links

Athlete bio at 2012 Olympics website

1987 births
Living people
Bahamian male sprinters
Olympic athletes of the Bahamas
Olympic gold medalists for the Bahamas
Olympic silver medalists for the Bahamas
Commonwealth Games medallists in athletics
Athletes (track and field) at the 2008 Summer Olympics
Athletes (track and field) at the 2010 Commonwealth Games
Athletes (track and field) at the 2011 Pan American Games
Athletes (track and field) at the 2012 Summer Olympics
Athletes (track and field) at the 2015 Pan American Games
Athletes (track and field) at the 2018 Commonwealth Games
Commonwealth Games bronze medallists for the Bahamas
Dickinson State University alumni
Medalists at the 2012 Summer Olympics
Medalists at the 2008 Summer Olympics
World Athletics Championships athletes for the Bahamas
Pan American Games bronze medalists for the Bahamas
People from Nassau, Bahamas
Olympic gold medalists in athletics (track and field)
Olympic silver medalists in athletics (track and field)
Pan American Games medalists in athletics (track and field)
People from New Providence
Medalists at the 2011 Pan American Games
Medallists at the 2010 Commonwealth Games
Medallists at the 2018 Commonwealth Games